Tacabamba District is one of nineteen districts of the Chota province in Peru.

References